Sapir is a community settlement in southern Israel. Located near Route 90, it falls under the jurisdiction of Central Arava Regional Council.

History
The village was established in 1979 and is named after Pinchas Sapir. It was planned by the architect Gershon Tzippor and was founded primarily to provide housing for municipal workers of the regional council.  As time passed, its nature changed.  As of 2006 it houses mostly people of various professions, as opposed to other settlements of the Aravah, which mostly do agriculture.

Near the community there is a nature park and an airstrip.

References

Central Arava Regional Council
Community settlements
Populated places in Southern District (Israel)
Populated places established in 1979
1979 establishments in Israel